Lomatium ambiguum, also known as Wyeth biscuitroot, is a perennial herb of the family Apiaceae that grows in the northwestern United States and into British Columbia in dry areas. The leaves are divided into many blades, and stems can be slightly purple and are 6–24 cm tall. Yellow flowers in compound umbels appear from late April to June.

Cultivation and uses
Like many Lomatium species, this was also utilized by Native Americans. The flowers and leaves were dried and used to flavor meats, stews and salads while a tea brewed of the same parts was taken for common colds and sore throats.

References
Footnotes

General
Craighead, John. A Field Guide to Rocky Mountain Wildflowers. Boston: Houghton Mifflin Company, 1998.

External links

 USDA Plants Profile for Lomatium ambiguum (Wyeth biscuitroot)

ambiguum
Flora of the Northwestern United States
Flora of British Columbia
Flora of Utah
Taxa named by John Merle Coulter
Flora without expected TNC conservation status